The 1913–14 Divizia A was the fifth season of Divizia A, the top-level football league of Romania.

Final table

References

1913-14
1913–14 in European association football leagues
1913–14 in Romanian football